The Bank of America Plaza is a 42-story skyscraper located in Downtown Tampa, in the U.S. state of Florida, and was completed in 1986. At , it surpassed One Tampa City Center as the tallest building in Tampa, until completion of 100 North Tampa in 1992. The structure was originally known as Barnett Plaza.

Plane incident

On January 5, 2002, just four months after the September 11, 2001, terrorist attacks, a 15-year-old amateur pilot, Charles Bishop, stole a Cessna plane and flew into the Bank of America building in Downtown Tampa. While it killed him, there were no other injuries (because the crash was on a Saturday, when few people were in the building). A suicide note found in the wreckage expressed support for Osama bin Laden. Bishop had been taking prescription medicine for acne called Accutane that may have had the side effect of depression or severe psychosis. His family later sued Hoffman-La Roche, the company that makes Accutane, for $70 million; however, an autopsy found no traces of the drug in the teenager's system.

See also
2002 Tampa plane crash
Downtown Tampa
List of tallest buildings in Tampa

References

External links
 Bank of America Plaza (Emporis)

Skyscraper office buildings in Tampa, Florida
Bank of America buildings
1986 establishments in Florida
HKS, Inc. buildings
Office buildings completed in 1986